The 2023 Pittsburgh Panthers football team will represent the University of Pittsburgh as a member of the Coastal Division of the Atlantic Coast Conference (ACC) during the 2023 NCAA Division I FBS football season. The Panthers will be led by ninth-year head coach Pat Narduzzi and played their home games at Acrisure Stadium in Pittsburgh. This will be Pitt's eleventh season as a member of the ACC.

Previous season 

The Panthers finished the 2022 season with an 9-4 record, and a 5-3 conference record. Pitt won their bowl game, the Sun Bowl, against UCLA 37–35 to end the season (The Game was also the second only upset in the bowl season).

Transfers

Outgoing

Incoming

Schedule
Pittsburgh and the ACC announced the 2023 football schedule on January 30, 2023. The 2023 season will be the conference's first season since 2004, that its scheduling format just includes one division. The new format sets Pittsburgh with three set conference opponents, while playing the remaining ten teams twice in an (home and away) in a four–year cycle. The Panthers three set conference opponents for the next four years is; Boston College, Syracuse, and Virginia Tech.

References

Pittsburgh
Pittsburgh Panthers football seasons
Pittsburgh Panthers football